The 1977 NC State Wolfpack football team represented the North Carolina State Wolfpack during the 1977 NCAA Division I football season. The team's head coach was Bo Rein. NC State has been a member of the Atlantic Coast Conference (ACC) since the league's inception in 1953. The Wolfpack played its home games in 1977 at Carter Stadium in Raleigh, North Carolina, which has been NC State football's home stadium since 1966.

Schedule

References

NC State
NC State Wolfpack football seasons
Peach Bowl champion seasons
NC State Wolfpack football